Casuarina Beach is in Karainagar, Jaffna District, Sri Lanka, about  from Jaffna. The Casuarina Beach in Karainagar is also called and written as Casoorina, Cashoorina and few other variants. This is considered to be the best beach in the Jaffna Peninsula with white sand. 

The beach got its name due to the Casuarina trees along the beach.

See also
Keerimalai
Kantharodai
Nallur (Jaffna)
Naguleswaram temple
Nallur Kandaswamy Kovil
Nainativu
Neduntheevu
Nilavarai
Idikundu

References

https://www.lonelyplanet.com/sri-lanka/karaitivu/attractions/casuarina-beach/a/poi-sig/1568416/1319598

Beaches of Sri Lanka
Landforms of Jaffna District
Tourist attractions in Northern Province, Sri Lanka